Introducing Phonology is a 2005 book by David Odden designed for an introductory course in phonology for both graduates and undergraduates.

Reception
The book was reviewed by Emily Curtis and Miguel Cuevas-Alonso.
It also received short reviews from B. Elan Dresher (University of Toronto), Bert Vaux (University of Cambridge) and Martin Krämer (University of Tromsø).

References

External links
Introducing Phonology

2005 non-fiction books
Phonology books
Linguistics textbooks
Cambridge University Press books